Central High School is a public high school in the Providence Public School District, Rhode Island, United States.

Central High School stands roughly at the intersection of the Federal Hill, West End, and Upper South Providence neighborhoods.

Notable alumni
Marvin Barnes, professional basketball player
Frank Caprio, judge
Ed Cooley, Providence College basketball coach

References

External links
 
 Student-created school Website
 Central fact sheet

Public high schools in Rhode Island
Education in Providence, Rhode Island